Hong Liangji (1746–1809), courtesy names Junzhi and Zhicun, was a Chinese scholar, statesman, political theorist, and philosopher. He was most famous for his critical essay to the Jiaqing Emperor, which resulted in his banishment to Yili in Xinjiang. In modern times, he is best remembered for his essay Zhi Ping Pian ("On Governance and Well-being of the Empire") on population growth and its sociopolitical consequence, in which he raised many of the same issues that were raised by Malthus writing during the same period in England.

Life
Hong was born in Changzhou and was relatively slow in his accomplishment of the rank of jinshi, which he finally attained at the age of 44.  He held minor government posts up until his criticism of the Jiaqing Emperor in the early nineteenth century which focused on the emperor's failure to weed out corrupt officials like Heshen or reform the bureaucracy that had allowed Heshen to secure power. Although well-intentioned and meant to serve as a call to action, the punishment for his transgression was originally decapitation, and subsequently lessened to banishment. Later, the emperor once more commuted Hong's sentence and pardoned him completely in hopes of ending a drought.

Philosophy
Hong was a proponent of the New Text scholarship, and felt that political remonstrance was part of his Confucian duty, as many other philosophers of his time did.  He was concerned with such issues as population control, geography, the Chinese classics, and government corruption.  He critically re-evaluated the common Chinese assumption that a growing population was the sign of a good government.

Zhi Ping Pian and theory on population growth
Hong's time experienced one of the fastest expansions of population in Chinese history. With the promotion of New World crops such as corn, Chinese population tripled from 100 million (1651–1661) to 300 million (1790). The population boom resulted in a series of socioeconomic problems, and caused concerns among the Mandarins. In 1791, Qianlong Emperor expressed his worry to the court officials that the resources might not be able to support the growing population. Two years later, Hong published Zhi Ping Pian, the 26th essay of his anthology Opinions.

In Zhi Ping Pian, Hong points to the tension between the growth of the means of subsistence and the growing population. He writes that the tension would be relieved by disasters, famine, and plagues.

Hong points out that government can mediate the problem by policies like adjusting tax, encouraging colonization, and enhancing the social safety net. However, he expresses his concern about the limits of human policy in addressing such an inherent structural dilemma.

Works
Hong was a prolific writer, with more than 20 books published, including multiple volumes of essays, prose works and poems. In addition to his philosophical works, Hong was also a noted historian, known for his study of historical geography.

Letter to Prince Cheng Earnestly Discussing the Political Affairs of the Time, 1799
Opinions, 1793

References
 de Bary, William Theodore and Irene Bloom, eds.  Sources of Chinese Tradition.
 Kuhn, Philip A. Origins of the Modern Chinese State
 Madeleine Zelin, The Magistrate's Tael: Rationalizing Fiscal Reform in Eighteenth-Century Ch'ing China (Berkley, 1984), pp. 294–297.
 Helen Dunstan, “Official Thinking on Environmental Issues and the State’s Environmental Roles in Eighteenth-Century China” in Mark Elvin and Ts'ui-jung Liu eds. Sediments of Time (New Haven: Yale University Press, 2006), 585-616.
 

1746 births
1809 deaths
Chinese Confucianists
Philosophers from Jiangsu
Qing dynasty essayists
Qing dynasty historians
18th-century Chinese philosophers
Qing dynasty poets
Qing dynasty politicians from Jiangsu
Writers from Changzhou
Politicians from Changzhou
Poets from Jiangsu
Historians from Jiangsu
19th-century Chinese historians
18th-century Chinese historians
Chinese historical geographers